Groff is an anglicized form of the surname Graf or Graff and of predominantly Swiss and sometimes German origin. Notable people with the surname include:

 Andrew Groff, American businessman and politician
 Jonathan Groff (born 1985), American actor
 Jonathan Groff, American comedy writer
 Lauren Groff (born 1978), American writer
 Mike Groff (born 1961), American racing driver
 Peter Groff (born 1963), American politician from Colorado
 Richard F. "Regis" Groff (1935-2014), American politician from Colorado
 Robbie Groff (born 1966), American racing driver
 Ulysses Grant Groff (1865–1950), American landowner and philanthropist
Skip Groff (1948–2019), American record producer
 Sarah True (née Groff, born 1981), American triathlete